

Leofgar (or Leosgar; died ) was a medieval Bishop of Lichfield.

Leofgar was consecrated after 1017 and died sometime before about 1026. He was appointed by Cnut, the king of England, and nothing is known of why he was chosen or of his background.

Citations

References

External links
 

1020s deaths
11th-century English Roman Catholic bishops
Anglo-Saxon bishops of Lichfield
Year of birth unknown